The 1989 Virginia Slims Championships was the nineteenth WTA Tour Championships, the annual tennis tournament for the best female tennis players in singles on the 1989 WTA Tour. It was the 19th edition of the tournament and was held from November 13 through November 19, 1989 on indoor carpet courts in Madison Square Garden in New York City, United States. First-seeded Steffi Graf won the singles title, her second at the event after 1987,  and earned $125,000 first-prize money.

Champions

Singles

 Steffi Graf defeated  Martina Navratilova, 6–4, 7–5, 2–6, 6–2.

Doubles

 Martina Navratilova /  Pam Shriver defeated  Larisa Savchenko /  Natasha Zvereva, 6–3, 6–2.

References

External links
 
 ITF tournament edition details
 Tournament draws

WTA Tour Championships
Virginia Slims Championships
Virginia Slims Championships
Virginia Slims Championships
1980s in Manhattan
Virginia Slims Championships
Madison Square Garden
Sports competitions in New York City
Sports in Manhattan
Tennis tournaments in New York City